Clear ice refers to a solid precipitation which forms when air temperature is between  and  and there are supercooled, relatively large drops of water (from freezing fog). A rapid accretion and a slow dissipation of latent heat of fusion favor the formation of a transparent ice coating, without air or other impurities. A similar phenomenon occurs when freezing rain or drizzle hit a surface and is called glaze. Clear ice, when formed on the ground, is often called black ice, and can be extremely hazardous.

Clear ice is denser and more homogeneous than hard rime; like rime, however, clear ice accumulates on branches and overhead lines, where it is particularly dangerous due to its relatively high density.

See also

Ice storm
SAS Flight 751

References

External links
Gevi Ice Maker Info
Weather Glossary, C

Water ice
Snow or ice weather phenomena